Nikolina Grabovac (born 3 June 1968 in Zenica, SFR Yugoslavia) is a former Croatian and Yugoslav female professional basketball player.

Sources
Profile at eurobasket.com
Profile at fiba.com

1968 births
Living people
Sportspeople from Zenica
Croats of Bosnia and Herzegovina
Croatian women's basketball players
Yugoslav women's basketball players
Shooting guards